Dr. Ushadevi Narendra Bhosle is an Indian mathematician, educator and researcher. She specialises in Algebraic Geometry. She worked on the moduli spaces of bundles.

Early life and education
She got a B.Sc. degree in 1969 and an M.Sc. degree in 1971 from University of Pune, Shivaji University, respectively. She commenced her post-graduate studies in 1971 from Tata Institute of Fundamental Research and got her doctorate degree of philosophy under the guidance of her mentor S.Ramanan in 1980.

Career 
She started her career with being a research assistant at the Tata Institute of Fundamental Research from 1971 to 1974. Then she became the Research Associate II in the same institute Tata Institute of Fundamental Research, from 1974 to 1977. Later on, she became a Research Fellow from 1977-1982, a Fellow from 1982–1990 and a Reader 1991-1995 at the same institute . She was the Associate Professor 1995 - 1998, Professor 1998-2011 and Senior Professor 2012-2014 at the same institute Tata Institute of Fundamental Research.

She was the Raja Ramanna fellow 2014 - 2017 at Indian Institute of Science, Bangalore. She is INSA Senior Scientist at Indian Statistical Institute, Bangalore from Jan 2019.

Membership 
She is the member of FASc, FNASc, FNASI and VBAC international committees. She also was the senior associate of International Centre of Theoretical Physics, Italy. She was a fellow member of the Indian National Science Academy, Delhi, Indian Academy of Sciences, Bangalore and National Academy of Sciences, Allahabad, India.

Works
She has 66 publications.
 Desale U.V. and Ramanan S. Poincare Polynomials of the variety of stable bundles, Math. Ann.vol. 216, no.3,(1975)233-244. 
Desale U.V. and Ramanan S.: Classification of vector bundles of
rank two on hyperelliptic curves. Invent. Math. 38, 161-185 (1976). 
Bhosle (Desale) Usha N.:
Moduli of orthogonal and spin bundles over 
hyperelliptic curves. Compositio Math. 51, 15-40 (1984). 

Bhosle Usha N. (1992), Parabolic sheaves on higher dimensional varieties,Math. Ann. 293 177–192
Bhosle, U.N.  (1986): Nets of quadrics and vector bundles on a double plane. Math. Zeit.192, 29–43
Bhosle Usha N. (1992), Generalised parabolic bundles and applications to torsion-free sheaves on nodal curves.Ark. Mat. 30  187–215
Bhosle, U.N. (1989), Ramanathan, A.: Moduli of parabolicG-bundles on curves. Math. Z.202, 161–180
BHOSLE, U. (1999). VECTOR BUNDLES ON CURVES WITH MANY COMPONENTS. Proceedings of the London Mathematical Society, 79(1), 81-106.
Bhosle Usha N (1995), Representations of the fundamental group and vector bundles,Math. Ann.302 601–608

Awards and honours 
She was awarded by Stree Shakti Science Samman in 2010 and Ramaswamy Aiyer Memorial Award in 2000.

Personal life 
Apart from mathematics, her other interests are drawing, painting, reading and music. Currently, she lives in Mumbai.

References

External links

20th-century Indian mathematicians
Indian women mathematicians
Shivaji University alumni
Living people
Fellows of the Indian National Science Academy
Fellows of The National Academy of Sciences, India
Date of birth missing (living people)
Place of birth missing (living people)
Savitribai Phule Pune University alumni
Tata Institute of Fundamental Research alumni
20th-century women mathematicians
Year of birth missing (living people)